Stephanie Tague (born 1966) is an English actress who was active in film and television during the 1980s. Her earliest role was as Victoria Dennison in the 1982 British children's television series Andy Robson. She went on to play the part of Michelle Robinson in the long-running British soap opera Coronation Street.

Filmography

Films
 Singleton's Pluck (1984)

Television
 Andy Robson (1982), as Victoria Dennison
 Robin of Sherwood (1984), as Lady Mildred de Barcy
 Sorrell and Son (1984)
 Coronation Street (1985), as Michelle Robinson

References

External links
 

English television actresses
English film actresses
British actresses
1966 births
Living people